Ian Talbot (born 24 January 1977), is a former professional rugby league footballer who played in the 1990s and 2000s.

After ending his playing career, Talbot began coaching at St Helens R.F.C. in 2002 as assistant coach to Keiron Purtill for the Under-18's side. He progressed through the coaching ranks at Saints and spent four years as head coach of their Under-20s before becoming head coach of Rochdale Hornets in October 2012.

References

External links
Statistics at wigan.rlfans.com
Rugby League: Smith inspires 10-try Wigan
1999 Rugby League: Team-By-Team Guide To Super League

1977 births
Living people
Dewsbury Rams players
Place of birth missing (living people)
Rochdale Hornets coaches
Rugby league hookers
Wakefield Trinity players
Wigan Warriors players